Glen Ellen is a census-designated place (CDP) in Sonoma Valley, Sonoma County, California, United States.  The population was 784 at the 2010 census, down from 992 at the 2000 census.  Glen Ellen is the location of Jack London State Historic Park (including the Wolf House), Sonoma Valley Regional Park, and a former home of Hunter S. Thompson.

The whole of Glen Ellen was severely damaged by the Nuns Fire during the October 2017 Northern California wildfires.

History

In 1859, Charles V. Stuart purchased a part of the Rancho Agua Caliente land grant and in 1868 began building a house there, eventually establishing a  vineyard he named Glen Ellen after his wife.  The town that grew up around the vineyard also came to be called Glen Ellen, and Stuart's home was later renamed Glen Oaks Ranch.

In October 2017, the area was badly affected by wildfire.

Geography
Sonoma Creek, the principal river of the Sonoma Valley, flows through Glen Ellen.

Demographics

2010
The 2010 United States Census reported that Glen Ellen had a population of 784. The racial makeup of Glen Ellen was 693 (88.4%) White, 3 (0.4%) African American, 9 (1.1%) Native American, 16 (2.0%) Asian, 3 (0.4%) Pacific Islander, 18 (2.3%) from other races, and 42 (5.4%) from two or more races. Hispanic or Latino of any race were 67 persons (8.5%).

The Census reported that 98.3% of the population lived in households and 1.7% lived in non-institutionalized group quarters.

There were 364 households, out of which 74 (20.3%) had children under the age of 18 living in them, 172 (47.3%) were opposite-sex married couples living together, 26 (7.1%) had a female householder with no husband present, 14 (3.8%) had a male householder with no wife present.  There were 23 (6.3%) unmarried opposite-sex partnerships, and 6 (1.6%) same-sex married couples or partnerships. 122 households (33.5%) were made up of individuals, and 34 (9.3%) had someone living alone who was 65 years of age or older. The average household size was 2.12.  There were 212 families (58.2% of all households); the average family size was 2.67.

The population was spread out, with 126 people (16.1%) under the age of 18, 37 people (4.7%) aged 18 to 24, 142 people (18.1%) aged 25 to 44, 376 people (48.0%) aged 45 to 64, and 103 people (13.1%) who were 65 years of age or older.  The median age was 51.4 years. For every 100 females, there were 103.6 males.  For every 100 females age 18 and over, there were 101.2 males.

The homeowner vacancy rate was 1.3%; the rental vacancy rate was 4.0%. 60.5% of the population lived in owner-occupied housing units and 37.9% lived in rental housing units.

2000
As of the census of 2000, there were 992 people, 340 households, and 219 families residing in the CDP. There were 387 housing units at an average density of 185/sq mi (71/km2). The racial makeup of the CDP was 89.4% White, 1.9% African American, 1.2% Native American, 1.2% Asian, 0.40% Pacific Islander, 2.7% from other races, and 3.1% from two or more races.  8.5% of the population were Hispanic.

There were 340 households, out of which 34.7% had children under the age of 18, 49.4% were married couples living together, 10.6% had a female householder with no husband present, and 35.3% were non-families. 25.0% of all households consisted of individuals, and 3.8% had someone living alone who was 65 or older.  The average household size was 2.39 and the average family size was 2.91.  The age distribution was as follows: 28.6% under the age of 18, 5.3% from 18 to 24, 23.9% from 25 to 44, 33.9% from 45 to 64, and 8.3% who were 65 years of age or older.  The median age was 41 years. For every 100 females, there were 120.9 males.  For every 100 females age 18 and over, there were 98.3 males.

The median income for a household in the CDP was $52,143, and the median income for a family was $54,219. Males had a median income of $50,714 versus $35,952 for females. The per capita income for the CDP was $22,680.  About 11.5% of families and 14.8% of the population were below the poverty line, including 16.8% of those under age 18 and none of those age 65 or over.

Points of interest
Writer Jack London lived in Glen Ellen from 1909 to his death in 1916, where he devoted much of his time to development of his Beauty Ranch and the building of his mansion, Wolf House. Many of his novels and stories, notably The Iron Heel and The Valley of the Moon mention Glen Ellen and Sonoma County. ("The Valley of the Moon" is a translation of Sonoma Valley's name given by the Pomo and Coast Miwok peoples.)

The site of his ranch is now Jack London State Historic Park, which contains the ruins of Wolf House, several ranch buildings, the grave of Jack and Charmian London, a museum housed in Charmian London's "House of Happy Walls", and a restaurant.

Glen Ellen is also the home of several gourmet star restaurants such as:
 The Glen Ellen Star
 Yeti Restaurant
 Aventine
 Glen Ellen Inn
 The Fig Cafe
 The Wolf House
 Olive and Vine

The Sonoma Developmental Center is located just outside Glen Ellen near the Jack London ranch. Its predecessor, the California Home for the Care and Training of Feeble Minded Children, was the setting for Jack London's story "Told in the Drooling Ward."

Glen Ellen is located in the Wine Country and is part of the Sonoma Mountain AVA.  Like all the communities in Sonoma Valley, Glen Ellen is home to many vineyards and wineries including B.R. Cohn Winery, Benziger Family Winery, Mayo Family Winery, and Valley of the Moon Winery.

Quarryhill Botanic Garden, located near Glen Ellen, is a research botanical garden housing with one of the largest collections of temperate Asian plants in North America. Quarryhill's collection includes rare species such as Acer pentaphyllum, Cornus capitata, Holboellia coriacea, Illicium simonsii, and Rosa chinensis var. spontanea, all native to Sichuan, China, as well as extensive collections of various wild Asian dogwoods, lilies, magnolias, maples, oaks, roses, and rhododendrons. Quarryhill is open to the public.

Dunbar school is the second oldest school in California.  Dunbar School is an elementary school that teaches grades K-5. Their mascot is the Dolphins and it is part of the Sonoma Valley Unified School District.

Government

Notable people

 M. F. K. Fisher, food writer
 Albert E. Kahn, journalist, photographer, and author
 Bernie Krause, musician and soundscape ecologist
 John Lasseter, animator, film director, screenwriter, and producer
 Jack London, novelist, journalist, and social activist
 Hunter S. Thompson, journalist and author
Nikita Ducarroz, BMX freestyle cyclist and Olympic medalist

See also
 Lake Suttonfield
 Arnold Drive Bridge

References

External links

The World of Jack London
City Info
Glen Ellen Historical Society
From Champagne to California (1850)

 
Census-designated places in Sonoma County, California
Sonoma Valley
Census-designated places in California